Ti Green is a British set and costume designer for stage and film.

Early life
Green grew up in Twickenham and Kew, south-west London, in the 1970s, where she attended Queen's School, Kew, and Godolphin and Latimer, Hammersmith.

Life
In 1980 she was bridesmaid to Phil Lynott and Caroline Crowther, the daughter of British comedian Leslie Crowther.

In 2007 she was the costume designer for a two act play on Broadway.

And in 2009 she had a child who she named Dylan Price. The father of the boy is Dave Price who, in 2010, she went on to marry.

References

Year of birth missing (living people)
Living people
British costume designers
Tony Award winners